The Anglo-French conflicts on Hudson Bay were a series of conflicts in the 17th and 18th centuries between England and France for control over the area around the Hudson Bay.

Overview 
Beginning in 1672, the French sought to drive out the English Hudson's Bay Company (HBC) trading posts that were established on Hudson Bay in 1668. This continued during King William's War and mostly ended in 1713, when France recognized British sovereignty over the Bay in the Treaty of Utrecht. The last instance would be in 1782, when the French captured Fort Churchill (Prince of Wales Fort).

Since the posts were held by, at most, a few dozen traders and labourers, they could easily be captured by a small group of soldiers; however, it was difficult to send soldiers to the Bay and impractical to keep them there over winter. The short ice-free season made it difficult to take all the posts in one year. Thus, the posts changed hands more or less at random whenever one side or the other sent a force into the Bay. Only in 1697 did significant British and French forces met on the bay when the Battle of Hudson's Bay was fought.

List of conflicts

Prior to 1670 
1658–68: Pierre-Esprit Radisson and Médard des Groseilliers learned that the best furs come from north of Lake Superior. When their plans are rejected at Quebec they turned to the English.
1668–69: Proto-HBC trade for one winter at Rupert House. (See: Médard des Groseilliers.)

1670s 
1670: Hudson's Bay Company founded.
1670–79: English trading posts built on James Bay, including: 
1668: Rupert House (southeast)
1673: Moose Factory (south) and Fort Albany (west).
1672: Father Charles Albanel travels from Quebec to Rupert House, but finds it deserted.
1674: Albanel again reaches Rupert House. He and Groseillers are sent to England. Father Albanel and French money induce Groseillers to return to the French service.
1679: Radisson is in Paris.

1670-1688 
1682: One French (which included Médard des Groseilliers) and two English groups reach the mouth of the Hayes River. The French capture the English.
1686: Hudson Bay expedition — A large French force from Montreal captures the three HBC posts on James Bay. The HBC now has only York Factory.
1688: Battle of Fort Albany — Pierre Le Moyne d'Iberville in the Soleil d'Afrique returns to James Bay to pick up the remaining furs. There, he defeats two English ships and returns to France.

King William's war (1688-97) 
England's Glorious Revolution lead to a renewed war with France for nine years. Below is a list of incidents during the war:  
1690: D'Iberville tries to capture York Factory but finds it guarded by a warship. He goes south and captures Fort Severn.
1693: James Knight captures Fort Albany and 30,000 pelts.
1694: Capture of York Factory — D'Iberville captures York Factory.
1695: Three Royal Navy frigates recapture York Factory. The French now hold no forts on the bay.
1697: Battle of Hudson's Bay — A naval battle takes place, after which d'Iberville retakes York Factory and France retains it until 1713.
1698: The war ends and there seems to have been little action thereafter.

18th century 
1709: Battle of Fort Albany (1709) —  During Queen Anne's War, 100 French soldiers try to capture Fort Albany but are driven off. This seems to be the only case of a fort being successfully defended.
1713: Treaty of Utrecht — British sovereignty over Hudson Bay recognized by France.
After 1713, military competition was replaced by an economic one as the French, and later other British traders, tried to divert trade from the HBC to Montreal. This lasted until 1821, when the HBC absorbed the Montreal traders. In the interior, there were scattered fights involving the traders and their Indian allies, but these have left few records.
1763: Treaty of Paris — France cedes all of Canada to Britain.
1782: Hudson Bay expedition — La Perouse successfully raids Prince of Wales Fort and York Factory.

References

Morton, Arthur S. c.1940. A History of the Canadian West to 1870-71.
Newman, Peter C. 1998. Empire of the Bay.

Hudson's Bay Company
Hudson_Bay, List_of_Anglo-French_conflicts_on
Hudson Bay
Natural resource conflicts
Military operations of the Early Modern period
Hudson Bay
Timelines of New France history
Timelines of military conflicts
Rupert's Land
Events in New France
Corporate warfare
Anglo-French_conflicts_on_Hudson_Bay, List of